Foley Island is a low-lying Canadian arctic island located in Nunavut, Canada. It is along the southern coast of Baffin Island in the Foxe Basin and measures  in area. Foley Island is uninhabited.

The first written recording of the island's existence was in 1948, as were neighboring Prince Charles Island and Air Force Island, by a Royal Canadian Air Force crew member, Albert-Ernest Tomkinson, navigating an Avro Lancaster.

References

Islands of Foxe Basin
Uninhabited islands of Qikiqtaaluk Region